"Red" (stylized in all caps) (Korean: 빨개요; RR: Ppalgaeyo) is a song recorded by South Korean singer-songwriter  Hyuna from her third extended play, A Talk. The song was released on July 28, 2014.

Reception

The single "Red" reached number 3 on the Gaon Weekly Digital Chart.  On August 6, 2014, Hyuna won her first ever music show award on MBC Music's Show Champion for "Red", and won on the same show again the following week.

Despite calling "Red" "fifty shades of messy," Lucas Villa of AXS praised Hyuna for delivering a "club banger that would make Miley proud." Rolling Stone named "Red" number 5 on their year-end list of the top ten music videos of 2014. "Red" ranked number 1 on Chinese Music Charts for four consecutive days, and has made it to the No. 1 spot on Taiwan's music charts.

Awards and nominations

Charts and sales

Weekly charts

Monthly charts

Year-end Chart

Sales

References

2014 singles
Korean-language songs
Hyuna songs
Cube Entertainment singles
2014 songs